Giuseppe Avellone (born 23 March 1943) is a retired Italian backstroke swimmer who competed at the 1960 Summer Olympics. He finished sixth with the 4 × 100 m medley relay team and failed to reach the final of the individual 100 m backstroke event.

References

1943 births
Living people
Italian male backstroke swimmers
Swimmers at the 1960 Summer Olympics
Olympic swimmers of Italy
20th-century Italian people